Adolfo Sánchez Vázquez (September 17, 1915 – July 8, 2011) was a Spanish-born Mexican philosopher, writer and professor born in Algeciras, Andalucia.

Biography
After studying philosophy at the University of Madrid, Vázquez emigrated to Mexico in 1939 with thousands of other intellectuals, scientists and artists following the defeat of the Republic in the Spanish Civil War, in which he participated as editor of the central publication of the Juventudes Socialistas Unificadas (JSU) “Ahora”. Sánchez was appointed a full-time professor of philosophy at the National Autonomous University of Mexico in 1959, becoming a professor emeritus of the university in 1985. Sánchez also held honorary doctoral degrees from the Universidad Autónoma de Puebla and the University of Cádiz (Spain).

He embraced Marxism, although an open, renovating, critical and non-dogmatic version of it.  His fresh interpretation of Marxism ran parallel to that of the Frankfurt School. In fact, The Philosophy of Praxis was published at around the same time as Herbert Marcuse was writing his  One Dimensional Man. In regard to ethics, he opposed normativism.

Philosophical works
 The Aesthetic Ideas of Marx (1965)
 The Philosophy of Praxis (1967)
 Rousseau in Mexico (The Philosophy of Rousseau and the Ideology of Independence) (1969)
 Aesthetics and Marxism (1970)
 Anthology. Texts of Aesthetics and Theory of Art (1972)
 Art and Society: Essays in Marxist Aesthetics (1973)
 From Scientific Socialism to Utopian Socialism (1975).

Miscellaneous
Memoirs
 Recollections and Reflections of an Exile (1997)

Poetry
 Poetry (2005)

See also
 Western Marxism

References
 Gandler, Stefan: Critical Marxism in Mexico: Adolfo Sánchez Vázquez and Bolívar Echeverría, Leiden/Boston, Brill Academic Press, 2015. 467 pages. .(Historical Materialism Book Series, ; vol. 87.)
 Gandler, Stefan: Peripherer Marxismus. Kritische Theorie in Mexiko. Hamburg, Berlin: Argument-Verlag, 1999. 459 pages, .
 Gandler, Stefan: Marxismo crítico en México, Adolfo Sánchez Vázquez y Bolívar Echeverría.'' (Foreword: Michael Löwy.) México, D.F.: Fondo de Cultura Económica / Facultad de Filosofía y Letras UNAM / Universidad Autónoma de Querétaro, 2007, 621 pages, . Reprint: 2008.

External links
  Biography
  Adolfo Sánchez Vázquez and Marxism
  The Praxis in Sánchez Vázquez
  An interview with Sánchez Vázquez
 Spanish Philosopher Adolfo Sanchez Vazquez Dies in Mexico

1915 births
2011 deaths
20th-century Spanish philosophers
Marxist theorists
Marxist writers
Mexican philosophers
Mexican male writers
National Autonomous University of Mexico alumni
Academic staff of the National Autonomous University of Mexico
People from Algeciras
Spanish philosophers
Spanish emigrants to Mexico